Hippotes (Ancient Greek: Ἱππότης) may refer to a number of people from Greek mythology:

Hippotes, son of Mimas and father of Aeolus, the keeper of the Winds in the Odyssey. He was a mortal king.
Hippotes, a Corinthian prince as the son of King Creon, who accused Medea of the murder she had committed on his sister and his father. His persona was assumed by Medeus, son of Jason or Aegeus and Medea, when he came to the court of King Perses of Colchis.
Hippotes, a son of Phylas by Leipephilene, daughter of Iolaus, and great-grandnephew and great-grandson of Heracles.  When the Heracleidae, on their invading the Peloponnesus, were encamped near Naupactus, Hippotes killed the seer Carnus, in consequence of which the army of the Heracleidae began to suffer very severely, and Hippotes by the command of an oracle was banished for a period of ten years. He seems to be the same as the Hippotes who was regarded as the founder of Cnidus in Caria.

Notes

References 

 Apollonius Rhodius, Argonautica translated by Robert Cooper Seaton (1853-1915), R. C. Loeb Classical Library Volume 001. London, William Heinemann Ltd, 1912. Online version at the Topos Text Project.
 Apollonius Rhodius, Argonautica. George W. Mooney. London. Longmans, Green. 1912. Greek text available at the Perseus Digital Library.
 Conon, Fifty Narrations, surviving as one-paragraph summaries in the Bibliotheca (Library) of Photius, Patriarch of Constantinople translated from the Greek by Brady Kiesling. Online version at the Topos Text Project.
 Diodorus Siculus, The Library of History translated by Charles Henry Oldfather. Twelve volumes. Loeb Classical Library. Cambridge, Massachusetts: Harvard University Press; London: William Heinemann, Ltd. 1989. Vol. 3. Books 4.59–8. Online version at Bill Thayer's Web Site
 Diodorus Siculus, Bibliotheca Historica. Vol 1-2. Immanel Bekker. Ludwig Dindorf. Friedrich Vogel. in aedibus B. G. Teubneri. Leipzig. 1888–1890. Greek text available at the Perseus Digital Library.
 Gaius Julius Hyginus, Fabulae from The Myths of Hyginus translated and edited by Mary Grant. University of Kansas Publications in Humanistic Studies. Online version at the Topos Text Project.
 Pausanias, Description of Greece with an English Translation by W.H.S. Jones, Litt.D., and H.A. Ormerod, M.A., in 4 Volumes. Cambridge, MA, Harvard University Press; London, William Heinemann Ltd. 1918. Online version at the Perseus Digital Library
 Pausanias, Graeciae Descriptio. 3 vols. Leipzig, Teubner. 1903.  Greek text available at the Perseus Digital Library.
 Pseudo-Apollodorus, The Library with an English Translation by Sir James George Frazer, F.B.A., F.R.S. in 2 Volumes, Cambridge, MA, Harvard University Press; London, William Heinemann Ltd. 1921. Online version at the Perseus Digital Library. Greek text available from the same website.

Heracleidae
Mythological kings of Thessaly
Kings in Greek mythology
Corinthian characters in Greek mythology
bg:Хипот
de:Hippotes
fr:Hippotès
Corinthian mythology
Thessalian mythology